New Home is a small unincorporated community in the most northwestern corner of Dade County, Georgia, United States.  It is part of the Chattanooga, TN–GA Metropolitan Statistical Area. The community surrounds the ghost town of Cole City.

Geography

New Home is located in the northwestern part of Georgia, it borders Alabama state line. Chattanooga is approximately 23 miles from the New Home community. Trenton is 15 miles from the community. Scottsboro, Alabama is about 60 miles away.

See also 

 National Register of Historic Places listings in Dade County, Georgia
 Northwest Georgia Joint Development Authority
 Town Line, New York, seceded from the United States (unrecognized) and rejoined in 1946.

References

External links
 Dade County historical marker

 
1837 establishments in Georgia (U.S. state)
Populated places established in 1837
Georgia (U.S. state) counties
Chattanooga metropolitan area counties
Northwest Georgia (U.S.)
Counties of Appalachia
Former unrecognized countries